Platyrhinops is an extinct genus amphibamid temnospondyl from the Late Carboniferous (late Westphalian stage) of Ohio and the Czech Republic. It is known from many partial skeletons from the Linton site in Saline Township, Ohio and at least 6 partial specimens from the Nýřany site from the Nýřany Member of the Kladno Formation in the Czech Republic.

Gallery

See also
 Prehistoric amphibian
 List of prehistoric amphibians

References

Amphibamids
Dissorophids
Fossil taxa described in 1931
Pennsylvanian temnospondyls of Europe
Pennsylvanian temnospondyls of North America
Carboniferous Ohio
Kasimovian genera
Prehistoric amphibian genera